The 2011–12 Belmont Bruins men's basketball team represented Belmont University during the 2011–12 NCAA Division I men's basketball season. The Bruins, led by 26th-year head coach Rick Byrd, played their home games at Curb Event Center and were in their final season as members of the Atlantic Sun Conference. Belmont became a member of the Ohio Valley Conference on July 1, 2012.

The Bruins finished the season 27–8, 16–2 to be crowned Atlantic Sun regular season champions. They were also champions of the Atlantic Sun Basketball tournament to earn the conference's automatic bid into the 2012 NCAA tournament where they lost in the second round to Georgetown.

Roster

Schedule

|-
!colspan=9| Regular season

|-
!colspan=9| 2012 Atlantic Sun men's basketball tournament

|-
!colspan=9| 2012 NCAA tournament

References

Belmont Bruins men's basketball seasons
Belmont
Belmont